John S. Rumsfeld (born June 16, 1964) is an American cardiologist. He is the Chief Innovation Officer for the American College of Cardiology, and Professor of Medicine at the University of Colorado School of Medicine. He was previously the National Director of Cardiology for the U.S. Veterans Health Administration. Rumsfeld was named as Chief Innovation Officer for American College of Cardiology in 2015.

Career
Rumsfeld received his undergraduate degree in biology in 1986 from the University of California, Los Angeles, and his medical degree in 1991 from the University of Chicago. He completed internal medicine internship and residency at the University of California, San Francisco (1991–1994), and did a cardiology fellowship at the University of Colorado (1995–1999), where he received a doctoral degree in Epidemiology in 1999. He has been a staff cardiologist in the VA Eastern Colorado Healthcare System and a faculty member of the Division of Cardiology, University of Colorado, since 1999. He was promoted to Associate Professor in 1994 and to Professor in 2009.

Research
Starting in 2004, he led the development and implementation of the VA’s Clinical Assessment Reporting and Tracking (CART) Program. He continues to serve as National Director for the program, which involves all 76 VA Medical Centers that do cardiac catheterization procedures 

In 2005, he was named the Chief Science Officer for the American College of Cardiology’s National Cardiovascular Data Registry (NCDR) Program. He is also the current Chair of the NCDR Management Board. He is a member of the American College of Cardiology Board of Trustees, and is the current Chair of the American Heart Association’s Quality of Care and Outcomes Research Council.

Rumsfeld is an Associate Editor for the journal Circulation: Cardiovascular Quality and Outcomes and is on the Editorial Board for the Journal of the American College of Cardiology. He is a Fellow of the American College of Cardiology, American Heart Association, and American College of Physicians.

In 2010, he was appointed Acting National Director of Cardiology for the United States Department of Veterans Affairs, and confirmed as director in 2011. He was a founding member of the national Cardiovascular Outcomes Research Consortium and the Colorado Cardiovascular Outcomes Research (C-COR) consortium, which includes the University of Colorado Denver Health and Hospitals, VA Eastern Colorado Healthcare System, and Kaiser Colorado. He served on the National Heart, Lung, and Blood Institute (NHLBI) Cardiovascular Outcomes Research Workgroup.

Rumsfeld’s doctoral thesis and early cardiovascular outcomes research work principally focused on the measurement and predictors of patient health status outcomes, including patient symptom burden from disease, mental and physical functional status, and health-related quality of life.

He has had a long-standing research and clinical interest in the intersection of cardiovascular disease and depression. He has published a number of studies – and spoken nationally and internationally – on the topic. In recent years, his research has focussed on the effectiveness and safety of cardiovascular care delivery and therapeutics, building on his work with the ACC NCDR programs and national clinical quality programs in the VA.

Select publications
Dr. Rumsfeld has more than 200 scientific publications, including original research, editorials, and scientific statements.

References

External links
 
 Cardiovascular Outcomes Research Consortium
 C-COR consortium

1964 births
Living people
American cardiologists
University of Colorado faculty
Pritzker School of Medicine alumni
University of California, Los Angeles alumni
University of California, San Francisco alumni
Fellows of the American College of Cardiology